John Stephen Alford (born October 14, 1942) is an American politician. He has served as a Republican member for the 124th district in the Kansas House of Representatives from 2011 to 2019.

In 2018 he stated to an audience with reportedly no black members present that marijuana should not be legalised because of African-Americans' genetics and character make up.

Alford resigned from committee leadership positions on January 9, 2018, following controversy surrounding these statements.

References

1942 births
Living people
Republican Party members of the Kansas House of Representatives
21st-century American politicians
Politicians from Wichita, Kansas
People from Ulysses, Kansas
Farmers from Kansas